The 2019 Terengganu Amateur League or 2019 TAL M4 League is the 4th season of the Terengganu Amateur League, the fourth-tier league in Malaysia football league system, since its establishment in 2015. It is a part of the Malaysia M4 League. A total of 20 teams compete in the league this season.

Team
The following teams will be participate in the 2019 TAL M4 League.

 Besut United
 BTK CG Jaya
 CND
 CK Bintang Muda (New team)
 Delima Warriors
 Gemuda BTR
 Hulu Fighters (New team)
 Suhada FC
 FC Pemanis
 Island FC
 PBSMT
 Markless ST 
 Myxini Kuala Berang
 Real Chukai
 Raja Permin 
 Kerteh F.C. (New team)
 Sentul Patah FC (New team)
 Paka City (New team)
 Nor Farhan FC (New team)
 Unisza Rangers (New team)

Result

Super League

Premier League

TAL Cup

Bracket

Quarter-final

Semi-final

Final

Awards

Top Scorer

References

External links
Official Website

4
Malay